Jordan Richards (born ) is an Australian male volleyball player. He is part of the Australia men's national volleyball team. On club level he plays for Sporting Clube de Portugal.

References

External links
 profile at FIVB.org
  at sporting.pt

1993 births
Living people
Australian men's volleyball players
Place of birth missing (living people)